The 1927 Spanish Grand Prix (formally the III Gran Premio de España) was a Grand Prix motor race held at Circuito Lasarte on 31 July 1927. The race was held over 40 laps of a 17.315 km circuit, for a total race distance of 692.600 km. The race was won by Robert Benoist driving a Delage.

Classification

References

Spanish Grand Prix
Spanish Grand Prix
Grand Prix